Mardanshin (masculine), or Mardanshinа (feminine) is a Tatar surname. Notable people with the surname include:

 Rafael Mardanshin (born 1961), Russian politician
 Rinat Mardanshin (1963–2005), Russian motorcycle speedway rider

Tatar-language surnames